Glaphyristis lithinopa is a moth in the family Cosmopterigidae. It is found in New Guinea and Australia.

References

Natural History Museum Lepidoptera generic names catalog

Cosmopteriginae